Stan van Dijck (born 7 October 2000) is a Dutch professional footballer who plays as a centre-back for German club Phönix Lübeck.

Professional career
Van Dijck made his professional debut with VVV-Venlo in a 2-1 Eredivisie loss to PEC Zwolle on 14 December 2019. 

On 13 January 2021, Van Dijck van sent on loan for the remainder of the season to Roda JC Kerkrade.

In March 2022, VVV announced that they would not extend his contract, making him a free agent ahead of the 2022–23 season.

On 22 July 2022, van Dijck joined Phönix Lübeck in German fourth-tier Regionalliga Nord.

References

External links
 
 VVV-Venlo Profile

2000 births
People from Boxmeer
Footballers from North Brabant
Living people
Dutch footballers
VVV-Venlo players
Roda JC Kerkrade players
1. FC Phönix Lübeck players
Eredivisie players
Eerste Divisie players
Association football defenders
Dutch expatriate footballers
Expatriate footballers in Germany
Dutch expatriate sportspeople in Germany